A. J. Cruz (born February 20, 1991) is an American football wide receiver who is currently a member of the Edmonton Eskimos. Cruz played college football for Brown University.

High school career
Cruz attended Santa Margarita Catholic High School, in Rancho Santa Margarita, California. He lettered in both Football and Basketball. As a football player, Cruz was named a two time All-Trinity League selection, and holds three school records for longest kick off return for a Touch Down (97 yards), highest kickoff return average (34 yards) and highest vertical jump (37 inches). Cruz helped lead his schools basketball team to a state championship, and was named to the  California Scholarship Federation.

College career

Cruz attended Brown University. As a freshman, Cruz earned Second-team All-Ivy Honors. As a sophomore, Cruz was selected for First-team All-Ivy Honors, while registering 2 interceptions and ranked second in both punt and kickoff returns.

In his senior season, Cruz earned First-team All-American honors. Cruz is one of 41 players in Ivy League history to earn First-team All-Ivy three times.

Professional career

Los Angeles KISS
Cruz joined the Los Angeles KISS in 2014. He returned 58 kickoffs for 1,305 yards in 11 games his rookie season. He was placed on recallable reassignment on March 13, 2015.

Arizona Rattlers
In the middle of the 2015 season, Cruz signed with the Arizona Rattlers as mostly a kick returner.

Chicago Bears
On July 27, 2015, the Bears signed Cruz to a three-year deal. On September 5, 2015, he was waived/injured by the Bears.

Miami Dolphins
On February 18, 2016, the Dolphins signed Cruz to a deal. On August 27, 2016, Cruz was waived by the Dolphins.

References

External links
Brown Bears bio

1991 births
Living people
American football wide receivers
Canadian football wide receivers
American players of Canadian football
Brown Bears football players
Los Angeles Kiss players
Arizona Rattlers players
Chicago Bears players
Miami Dolphins players
Calgary Stampeders players
Edmonton Elks players
Players of American football from California
Sportspeople from Lake Forest, California